The 1943 Iowa State Cyclones football team represented Iowa State College of Agricultural and Mechanic Arts (later renamed Iowa State University) in the Big Six Conference during the 1943 college football season. In their second year under head coach Mike Michalske, the Cyclones compiled a 4–4 record (3–2 against conference opponents), finished in third place in the conference, and outscored their opponents by a combined total of 147 to 104. They played their home games at Clyde Williams Field in Ames, Iowa. The Cyclones moved their kickoff times from 2 p.m. to 2:30 p.m. for the 1943 season.

The team's statistical leaders included Meredith Warner with 401 rushing yards and 31 points scored (three touchdowns and 13 extra points), Howard Tippee with 637 passing yards, and Hal Crisler with 139 receiving yards. Tippee was the only Iowa State player to be selected as a first-team all-conference player. There was no team captain selected for the 1943 season.

Schedule

References

Iowa State
Iowa State Cyclones football seasons
Iowa State Cyclones football